Allegiance Air is a charter airline based in Lanseria, South Africa.

History
The company started as a charter broker and commenced its own aircraft operations in February 2008. It is privately owned.

Fleet
The Allegiance Air fleet comprises the following aircraft (as of August 2017):

The airline fleet previously included the following aircraft (as of 4 November 2008):
 5 British Aerospace 146-200 (3 stored and 2 to Air Congo in 2008)

References

External links
Allegiance Air

Airlines of South Africa